Hemed is a mountain in the western part of the Arta Region in south-central Djibouti.

See also
Mabla Mountains

References

Mountains of Djibouti
Arta Region